Eressa dammermanni is a moth of the family Erebidae. It was described by van Eecke in 1933. It is found on Sumba, an island in eastern Indonesia.

References

Eressa
Moths described in 1933